Tom Daly may refer to:
Tom Daly (catcher) (1891–1946), American baseball catcher for the Chicago White Sox, Cleveland Indians, and Chicago Cubs, and Boston Red Sox coach, 1933–1946
Tom Daly (infielder) (1866–1938), American baseball second baseman for the Chicago Cubs, Washington Nationals, Brooklyn Dodgers, Chicago White Sox, and Cincinnati Reds
Tom Daly (filmmaker) (1918–2011), Canadian film producer
Tom Daly (basketball) (born 1991), Australian basketball player
Tom Daly (American politician) (born 1954), American politician in California
Tom Daly (Irish politician) (born 1938), Irish nationalist politician
Tommy Daly (1894–1936), Irish hurler
Tom Daly (rugby union) (born 1993), Irish rugby player

See also
Thomas Daly (disambiguation)
Tom Daley (disambiguation)